Cookie Crisp is a breakfast cereal that is manufactured to look like chocolate chip cookies. It is produced by General Mills in the United States and Cereal Partners in other countries. Introduced in 1977, it was originally produced by Ralston Purina until they sold the trademark to General Mills in 1997.

Varieties 
From its introduction in 1977 until the early 1990s, Cookie Crisp was available in three varieties: Chocolate Chip Cookie Crisp, Vanilla Wafer Cookie Crisp and Oatmeal Cookie Crisp.

Peanut Butter Cookie Crisp was introduced in 2005 but was phased out by 2007.

Double Chocolate Cookie Crisp was introduced in 2007. 

Sprinkles Cookie Crisp was introduced in July 2009. This variety contains crisps shaped like tiny vanilla cookies topped with tiny multicolored sprinkles. 

Birthday Cake Cookie Crisp was introduced in March 2018.

Imitations
In 1997, Ralston sold their cereal line to General Mills, who soon after changed the recipe.

Keebler Cookie Crunch was introduced by Kellogg's in 2008. This cereal has standard cookie pieces as well as round O shapes meant to resemble Keebler Fudge Shoppe Fudge Stripes cookies.

Advertising

Cookie Jarvis

The first Cookie Crisp mascot, Cookie Jarvis, was introduced in 1977. A wizard in the Merlin mold, he magically turns cookie jars into cereal bowls with a wave of his wand and rhyming incantations. He was voiced by Lennie Weinrib.

Cookie Crook and Cookie Cop
In 1980, Cookie Jarvis was joined by Cookie Crook, an anti-hero robber who attempts to steal the Cookie Crisp; in 1984 he was followed by his opponent, The Cookie Cop (full name Officer Crumb), a police officer (reminiscent of the Keystone Cops) with an Irish accent who thwarts the Cookie Crook's attempts to steal the Cookie Crisp.

A typical ad would begin with the Cookie Crook attempting to steal the cereal from a live-action breakfast table; often he and the Cookie Cop were portrayed as no larger than mice, so their pictures on the cereal bowl were "life-size". The Crook would have some new gadget or scheme to steal the cereal, but then the Cookie Cop would arrive and save the kid's cereal in the nick of time. Eventually, the format of the ads changed to full animation, and the duo was portrayed as the size of normal humans; an even more slapstick approach (similar to Looney Tunes) was used in these commercials.

Chip the Dog

In 1990, the Cookie Crook was given a sidekick named Chip the Dog.  From 1990 to 1996, while serving alongside the Cookie Crook in his schemes to steal Cookie Crisp, Chip would serve as a partial foil to the Cookie Crook, often by howling "Cooookie Crisp!" (with cookies in place of the Os in the word "cookie"), exposing them to Cookie Cop and, in some commercials, often saying "Doggone it" after his and the Cookie Crook's plans are foiled.

After General Mills bought the Cookie Crisp trademark Chip the Dog continued to be the mascot with the Cookie Crook and Cookie Cop from 1997 to 2005, with Cookie Crook and Cookie Cop removed from the commercials entirely. In the format of the advertisements, Chip was a friendly pooch, no longer wearing a mask, who offered Cookie Crisp to a group of kids. Typically an adult would interfere on the grounds that cookies are not breakfast food. Near the end of the ads, the adults would change their minds once Chip gave them a taste of his Cookie Crisp.

Chip the Wolf
In 2005, Chip was redesigned into a wolf which possessed the same thieving characteristics as Cookie Crook. His commercials have Chip attempting to steal Cookie Crisp cereal from children (mainly by creating decoy cookies to lure them away from the cereal) only to be foiled every time.

See also

 List of breakfast cereals

References

External links
 

General Mills cereals
Ralston cereals
Mascots introduced in 1977
Products introduced in 1977
Fictional wolves
Fictional dogs
Male characters in advertising
General Mills characters
Cookies